Corymica pryeri is a species of moth of the family Geometridae first described by Arthur Gardiner Butler in 1878. It is found in Japan, Taiwan, the north-eastern Himalayas, Sumatra, Borneo, New Guinea and possibly Queensland, Australia.

The wingspan is 25–30 mm.

The larvae feed on Lindera, Neolitsea, Machilus, Meratia and Persea species. The larvae are slender and bright green with a blackish central stripe and blackish markings. Pupation takes place in foliage in a loose, rusty orange cocoon of silk.

References

Hypochrosini
Moths of Japan